Sebastiano Antonio Tanara (10 April 1650 – 5 May 1724) was an Italian cardinal.

He studied law at the university of Bologna. He was internuncio in Flanders (1675-1687) and as, such, he was sent with secret mission to king James II of England, who had converted to Catholicism. In 1687 he was consecrated titular archbishop of Damasco and then served as papal nuncio in Cologne (1687–90), Portugal (1690–92) and Austria (1692–96). Pope Innocent XII created him Cardinal Priest in December 1695 and assigned to him the title of SS. IV Coronati on 21 May 1696. He participated in the Papal conclave, 1700. New Pope Clement XI named him Prefect of the S.C. of the Ecclesiestical Immunities. He was also legate in Urbino for twelve years (1703–15). Bishop of the suburbicarian sees of Frascati (1 April 1715) and Ostia e Velletri (3 March 1721). Dean of the Sacred College of Cardinals 1721-24; as such, he presided over Papal conclave, 1721. He died during sede vacante after the death of Pope Innocent XIII.

He was the uncle and mentor of the Alessandro Tanara (1680-1754), who was elevated to the cardinalate in 1743.

References

Biographical entry

18th-century Italian cardinals
1650 births
1724 deaths
Deans of the College of Cardinals
Cardinal-bishops of Frascati
Cardinal-bishops of Ostia
Apostolic Nuncios to Cologne
Apostolic Nuncios to Portugal
Apostolic Nuncios to Austria